Fools of the World is an independent record label in Sacramento, California that was founded in 1996 by the American rock band The 77s.

Fools of the World started as an independent label for the band to release their own music. Members of the band began to produce albums for other artists that would also be released through the label.

Artists
The 77s
The Lost Dogs
Lisa Phenix
Johnny Reliable
Michael Roe
Jason Todd Herring
Matt Nightingale
The Strawmen
Terry Scott Taylor
Vekora

Discography
 The 77s - Echos O' Faith (1996)
 The 77s - EP (1999)
 Michael Roe - It's For You (1999) [live album]
 The 77s - Late (2000) [compilation]
 The 77s - A Golden Field of Radioactive Crows (2001), with Galaxy21 Music
 The 77s - Direct (2002)
 Johnny Reliable - Going Hollywood (2002)
 Michael Roe/Terry Scott Taylor - All Day Sing and Dinner on the Ground (2003)
 The Strawmen - Saving Faded Dreams (2003)
 Lisa Phenix - Homegrown (2004)
 The Lost Dogs - MUTT (2004), with Lo-Fidelity Records 
 7&7iS - Fun With Sound (2005)
 Jason Todd Herring - Time In The Shadows (2005)
 The Lost Dogs - Island Dreams (2005)
 Matt Nightingale - Still Standing (2005)
 The 77s - Holy Ghost Building (2008), with Lo-Fidelity Records
 The Lost Dogs - Old Angel (2010), with Stunt Records
 Michael Roe - Michael Roe (2010) Tour Release
 The 77s - Happy Chrimbo 
 The 77s - Guilty Pleasures
 Michel Roe - Roesbuds
 Vekora - "Vekora" (2014)

See also
 List of record labels

American independent record labels
Record labels established in 1996
Rock record labels
Companies based in Sacramento, California